Sootea Assembly constituency is one of the 126 assembly constituencies of Assam Legislative Assembly. Sootea forms part of the Tezpur Lok Sabha constituency.

Members of Legislative Assembly
 1962: Bijoy Chandra Bhagabati, Indian National Congress
 1967: N.C. Bhuyan, Indian National Congress
 1972: Swarna Probha Mahanta, Indian National Congress
 1978: Golok Kakati, Janata Party
 1985: Robin Saikia, Independent
 1991: Kushal Sahu, Indian National Congress
 1996: Padma Hazarika, Asom Gana Parishad
 2001: Praneswar Basumatari, Indian National Congress
 2006: Padma Hazarika, Asom Gana Parishad
 2011: Padma Hazarika, Asom Gana Parishad
 2016: Padma Hazarika, Bharatiya Janata Party
 2021: Padma Hazarika, Bharatiya Janata Party

Election results

2021 result

2016 result

See also
 Sootea
 Tezpur
 List of constituencies of Assam Legislative Assembly

References

External links 
 

Assembly constituencies of Assam